Dioxetanedione may refer to:

 1,2-Dioxetanedione
 1,3-Dioxetanedione